Tang-e Suk (also Romanized as Tang-e Sūḵ; also known as Tang-e Sok) is a village in Eram Rural District, Eram District, Dashtestan County, Bushehr Province, Iran. At the 2006 census, its population was 39, in 8 families.

References 

Populated places in Dashtestan County